Comitas rex is a species of sea snail, a marine gastropod mollusc in the family Pseudomelatomidae, the turrids and allies

Description
The length of the shell attains 87 mm, its diameter 27.5 mm.

Distribution
This marine species occurs in the Tanimbar Islands, Indonesia.

References

 Sysoev, A., 1997. - Mollusca Gastropoda: New deep-water turrid gastropods (Conoidea) from eastern Indonesia. Mémoires du Muséum national d'Histoire naturelle 172: 325-35

External links
 Specimen at MNHN, Paris
 
 
 Biolib.cz: Comitas rex

rex
Gastropods described in 1997